{{DISPLAYTITLE:C8H7NO}}
The molecular formula C8H7NO (molar mass: 133.14728 g/mol, exact mass: 133.052764 u) may refer to:

 Indoxyl
 Mandelonitrile
 Oxindole (2-indolone)

Molecular formulas